Douglas Jardine's England national cricket team toured New Zealand in March 1933 as an afterword to their "bodyline" tour of Australia. England and New Zealand played a two-match Test series. New Zealand were captained by Curly Page. Both Tests were drawn. The second Test of the series, at Auckland, was the 200th Test match to be played by England.

Test series summary

First Test

Second Test

Wally Hammond's score of 336 not out in the second Test was the highest individual score in a Test match, breaking the record of 334 set by Don Bradman three years earlier.

References

1933 in English cricket
1933 in New Zealand cricket
New Zealand cricket seasons from 1918–19 to 1944–45
1932-33
International cricket competitions from 1918–19 to 1945